Tim Kelly (born 26 July 1994) is a professional Australian rules footballer playing for the West Coast Eagles in the Australian Football League (AFL). He formerly played for the Geelong Football Club between 2018 and 2019.

Early life and WAFL career

Kelly is from Perth and played his junior football for Palmyra. He has an Indigenous Australian father and a Chilean mother. He made his senior WAFL debut for the South Fremantle Football Club in 2013. He was runner-up in the club best and fairest in 2014. During the 2017 WAFL season he finished runner-up in the Sandover Medal to Haiden Schloithe. Before being drafted into the AFL, Kelly was an apprentice electrician. His partner/fiancée is Caitlin Miller and they have three sons.

AFL career

Geelong (2018-2019)
Kelly was drafted by Geelong with their second selection and twenty-fourth overall in the 2017 national draft as an over age draftee He made his debut in the three-point win against  at the Melbourne Cricket Ground in the opening round of the 2018 season. At the 2018 AFL Players' Association Awards he was voted Best First Year Player by fellow players. At the end of the 2018 season, Kelly requested a trade to the West Coast Eagles, a club that had previously overlooked him in numerous drafts, solely due to family reasons. But after long discussions, Geelong refused to trade him as they could not come to a suitable arrangement with the Eagles. After a stellar 2019 which included his first All-Australian selection, a preliminary final appearance and a top 5 finish in the Brownlow Medal, Kelly once again requested a trade to the Eagles due to the same reason. He was finally traded on 9 October.

West Coast Eagles (2020-)
Kelly's wish was finally granted after being traded the Eagles, who had traded Picks 14, 24, 37 and future first round pick to get Kelly. He signed a 6-year contract estimated worth $5 million.

Statistics
Statistics are correct to the end of the 2021 season

|- style="background:#EAEAEA"
| scope="row" text-align:center | 2018
| 
| 11 || 23 || 24 || 16 || 277 || 249 || 526 || 77 || 81 || 1.0 || 0.7 || 12.0 || 10.8 || 22.9 || 3.3 || 3.5 || 13
|-
| scope="row" text-align:center | 2019
| 
| 11 || 25 || 24 || 18 || 381 || 254 || 635 || 89 || 106 || 1.0 || 0.7 || 15.2 || 10.2 || 25.4 || 3.6 || 4.2 || 24
|- style=background:#EAEAEA
| scope=row | 2020 ||  || 11
| 18 || 5 || 6 || 208 || 153 || 361 || 46 || 75 || 0.3 || 0.2 || 11.6 || 8.5 || 20.1 || 2.6 || 4.2 || 11
|-
| scope=row | 2021 ||  || 11
| 19 || 6 || 8 || 245 || 209 || 454 || 62 || 64 || 0.3 || 0.4 || 12.9 || 11.0 || 23.9 || 3.3 || 3.4 || 
|- class="sortbottom"
! colspan=3 | Career
! 85
! 59
! 46
! 1111
! 865
! 1976
! 274
! 326
! 0.7
! 0.5
! 13.1
! 10.2
! 23.3
! 3.2
! 3.8
! 48
|}

Notes

References

External links

1994 births
Living people
Geelong Football Club players
South Fremantle Football Club players
Australian rules footballers from Western Australia
Indigenous Australian players of Australian rules football
Australian people of Chilean descent
Sportspeople of Chilean descent
West Coast Eagles players
All-Australians (AFL)